Annis is a female given name. It may also refer to:

Places
Annis, Idaho
Annis Mound and Village Site
Carlston Annis Shell Mound 
Lake Annis, a lake in Nova Scotia, Canada
Lake Annis, Nova Scotia, a community near the namesake lake
137165 Annis, an asteroid

As a surname
B. J. Annis (born 1947), American bodybuilder and professional wrestler
Francesca Annis (born 1945), English actress
Matthew Annis, Canadian professional wrestler
Ted Annis (born 1980), Canadian professional wrestler

Mythology and fiction
Black Annis, a bogeyman figure in English folklore